Julia Keilowa (Ringel) (born 1902 in Stryj, died 1943 in Warsaw) was a Polish artist industrial designer.

Early life 

She came from an assimilated Jewish family. She attended schools in Lviv and Vienna. She studied model manufacture at Lviv National Industrial School. In 1922 she married lawyer Ignacy Keil. She continued art studies at the Academy of Fine Arts in Warsaw. Her teachers included Karol Tichy, Wojciech Jastrzębowski, Józef Czajkowski and Tadeusz Breyer. During her studies she worked mainly with sculpture. In 1929 she became member of sculpting cooperative „Forma”.  She exhibited at Art Promotion Institute.

Designer 

In 1933 she established her own metalwork workshop. She designed around 400 usable objects, mainly plated objects. Warsaw factories produced her cutlery and crockery, including Norblin, Fraget and Henneberg Brothers. During Second World War for two years she led a ceramic workshop. She died most probably at Pawiak.

In autumn 2012 an exhibition of her works took place in Copper Museum in Legnica.

In October 2015, a major exhibition in Instytut Sztuki Polskiej Akademii Nauk focused solely on Keilowa's work.

Death 
Little is known about circumstances of her death; it is likely she died in the German-run Pawiak prison in 1943 during The Holocaust in Poland.

References

External links 
 Keilowa's work in Central Jewish Library

Further reading 
Out of the Ordinary: Polish Designers of the 20th Century by David Crowley, Adam Mickiewicz Institute, 2012

1902 births
1943 deaths
Artists from Warsaw
Polish designers
Polish Jews who died in the Holocaust
20th-century Polish women artists
People from Ryki County